Jo Kyong-chol is a North Korean politician and officer who is serving as the commander of the Military Security Command and a member of the WPK Central Military Commission.

Biography
He is assumed to be born in 1944 or 1945. In 2009 he was elected as a member of the 12th convocation of the Supreme People's Assembly. He participated in the purges of officials, among them of Jang Song-thaek in 2013. In June 2022 he was promoted a member of the Central Military Commission. He is under sanctions of the U.S. Department of the Treasury's Office of Foreign Assets Control. In 2015 he was ranked 47 in the funeral committee of Jon Pyong-ho. and following the death of Kim Jong-il a member of his funeral committee.

References

Members of the 8th Central Committee of the Workers' Party of Korea
Living people
North Korean generals
Members of the Supreme People's Assembly
Year of birth uncertain